Joy Langan (23 January 1943 – 30 July 2009) was a member of the House of Commons of Canada from 1988 to 1993. Her background was in journalism, writing and social activism.

She was elected in the 1988 federal election, representing the Mission—Coquitlam electoral district for the New Democratic Party. She served in the 34th Canadian Parliament but lost to Daphne Jennings of the Reform Party in the 1993 federal election. She also campaigned unsuccessfully in the 1997 federal election in the Port Moody—Coquitlam riding.

Death
Langan was diagnosed with breast cancer  and died after a battle with the disease in Port Moody, British Columbia on  30 July 2009, aged 66.

References

External links

1943 births
2009 deaths
Canadian women journalists
Deaths from breast cancer
Journalists from British Columbia
New Democratic Party MPs
Members of the House of Commons of Canada from British Columbia
Women members of the House of Commons of Canada
Women in British Columbia politics
Deaths from cancer in British Columbia
20th-century Canadian women politicians
Canadian women non-fiction writers